The following is a complete list of the 22 metropolitan areas in Florida, as defined by the United States Office of Management and Budget. The largest, Miami metropolitan area (Miami-Fort Lauderdale-West Palm Beach), is ranked 8th among the top metropolitan areas in the U.S. The second largest, Tampa Bay area (Tampa-St. Petersburg-Clearwater), is ranked 18th among the top metropolitan areas in the U.S.

Metropolitan areas
The following table lists population figures for those metropolitan areas, in rank of population. Population figures are as of the April 1, 2020 U.S. Census figures.

See also
 - As to TPA St Pete Metro Population, Forbes 2015 ranking
Table of United States Metropolitan Statistical Areas
Table of United States Combined Statistical Areas

References

 
Florida